Noteć Inowrocław is a Polish basketball team, based in Inowrocław. The team currently plays in the I Liga, the second tier in Poland.

References

Basketball teams in Poland
Inowrocław County
Sport in Kuyavian-Pomeranian Voivodeship